The Montgomery 17 is an American trailerable sailboat that was designed by Lyle Hess as a pocket cruiser and daysailer and first built in 1973.

The boat was built in conventional cruiser and flush deck daysailer models.

Production
The design was built by Montgomery Marine Products, Nor'Sea Yachts and Montgomery Boats in the United States, but it is now out of production.

Design
The Montgomery 17 is a recreational keelboat, built predominantly of fiberglass, with wood trim. It has a masthead sloop rig, a nearly-plumb stem, a vertical transom, a transom-hung rudder controlled by a tiller. Early boats had a fixed keel, while later ones had stub keel and swing keel combination.

The boat is normally fitted with a small  outboard motor for docking and maneuvering.

The conventional design has sleeping accommodation for three people, with a double "V"-berth in the bow cabin and a straight settee berth on the starboard side of the main cabin. The galley is located on the port side just forward of the companionway ladder. The galley is equipped with a two-burner stove and a sink. The head is located in the bow cabin, under the "V"-berth. In the late 1970s a factory option allowed installation of a fourth cabin berth in place of the galley

For sailing downwind the design may be equipped with a symmetrical spinnaker.

Variants
Montgomery 17
This model was designed by Lyle Hess and introduced in 1973.
Montgomery 17 FD
This flush deck model was designed by Lyle Hess and Gerry Montgomery and introduced in 1975. Only nine were built.

Operational history
In a 2010 review Steve Henkel wrote of the design, "best features: As with her little 15-foot sister [the Montgomery 15], we like her looks. She displays a good level of attention to detail in her construction, Worst features: With the same under body design as the Montgomery 15, compared to her comp[etitor]s she will have the same penalties. That is, she'll be harder to handle at the launching ramp and give poorer performance upwind."

See also
List of sailing boat types

References

External links
Photo of a Montgomery 17 sailing
Photo of a Montgomery 17 FD

Keelboats
1970s sailboat type designs
Sailing yachts
Trailer sailers
Sailboat types built in the United States
Sailboat type designs by Lyle Hess
Sailboat types built by Montgomery Marine Products
Sailboat types built by Nor'Sea Yachts
Sailboat types built by Montgomery Boats